Vyacheslav Viktorovich Mogilny (born 8 May 1971 in Dnipropetrovsk) is a Russian-Ukrainian football coach and a former player.

External links
 

1971 births
Footballers from Dnipro
Living people
Soviet footballers
Ukrainian footballers
Russian footballers
FC Baltika Kaliningrad players
FC Zhemchuzhina Sochi players
FC Kuban Krasnodar players
Russian Premier League players
Ukrainian football managers
Russian football managers
FC Baltika Kaliningrad managers
Russian expatriate football managers
Ukrainian expatriate football managers
Expatriate football managers in Lithuania
FK Žalgiris managers
FC Yugra Nizhnevartovsk players
Association football goalkeepers